A Registered Cardiovascular Invasive Specialist or RCIS assists a cardiologist with cardiac catheterization procedures in the United States.  These procedures can determine if a blockage exists in the blood vessels that supply the heart muscle and can help diagnose other problems.

To become registered they have to pass the registry proctored by CCI (Cardiovascular Credentialing International). The exam consists of 170 multiple choice questions.  Some questions involve mathematical computation as well as pictures where one must identify anatomy and equipment.  To be registry eligible, they must have worked in the Cardiac Catheterization Laboratory for one years or have graduated from a registry eligible program.  Santa Fe College in Gainesville, Florida has one such accredited program.

See also
 Cardiac catheterization

References

Cardiology